Merry Happy Whatever is an American comedy streaming television series starring Dennis Quaid. The series premiered on Netflix on November 28, 2019, and consisted of eight episodes. In April 2020, the series was canceled after one season.

Premise
Merry Happy Whatever takes place over the week or so around Christmas at the Quinn household. The story follows Don Quinn (Quaid) as he struggles with different stresses of the holidays. They are further complicated as Emmy (Mendler), the youngest of the family, brings home her boyfriend Matt (Morin) from California. The pair seeks Don's permission to get married. The controlling patriarch of the family is not pleased because Matt is a struggling musician.

Cast

Main

Dennis Quaid as Don Quinn, the hard and conservative patriarch of the Quinn family and a deputy sheriff in Bucks County, Pennsylvania. He always disapproves his children's spouses and does the same with Matt.
Bridgit Mendler as Emmy Quinn, Don's youngest daughter who brings her boyfriend home for the holidays
Brent Morin as Matt, Emmy's boyfriend who is a struggling musician in Los Angeles, constantly being shadowed by Don 
Ashley Tisdale as Kayla, Don's closeted middle daughter, who becomes Matt's friend
Siobhan Murphy as Patsy, Don's eldest optimistic and super excited daughter
Adam Rose as Todd, Don's Jewish son-in-law and Patsy's husband, who at all times tries to impress Don unsuccessfully
Elizabeth Ho as Joy Quinn, Don's daughter-in-law and Sean's wife, who tries to warn Matt that Don will do everything to get him away from Emmy
Hayes MacArthur as Sean Quinn, Don's dimwitted son who is recently unemployed

Recurring

Garcelle Beauvais as Nancy, a nurse at Morristown Urgent Care and Don's love interest
Mason Davis as Sean Jr., Sean's eldest son who recently became an atheist
Lucas Jaye as Donny, Sean's younger son

Guest
Tyler Ritter as Alan, Kayla's estranged husband who is planning to divorce her.
Chris Myers as Bryan, Nancy's son who disapproves the relationship between his mother and Don.
Dan Castellaneta as Ted Boseman, Don's friend who is forced into offering Emmy a great new job after Don did not arrest him after committing a crime.
Paul Dooley as Grandpa Jack, Don's father-in-law who openly dislikes Don and believes he was never good enough for his daughter.

Production
Filming began on May 21, 2019, and ended on July 24, 2019.

Episodes

See also
 List of Christmas films

References

External links

2010s American sitcoms
2010s American surreal comedy television series
2019 American television series debuts
2019 American television series endings
English-language Netflix original programming
Surrealist television series
Television shows set in Philadelphia
Christmas television series
Television series by Kapital Entertainment